The canton of Courrières  is a former canton situated in the department of the Pas-de-Calais and in the Nord-Pas-de-Calais region of northern France. It was disbanded following the French canton reorganisation which came into effect in March 2015. It had a total of 20,301 inhabitants (2012).

Geography 
The canton was organised around Courrières in the arrondissement of Lens. The altitude varies from 22m to 38m (Courrières) for an average altitude of 26m.

The canton comprised 2 communes:
Courrières
Oignies

Population

See also 
Cantons of Pas-de-Calais 
Communes of Pas-de-Calais 
Arrondissements of the Pas-de-Calais department

References

Former cantons of Pas-de-Calais
2015 disestablishments in France
States and territories disestablished in 2015